Community board may refer to:
 Community boards in New Zealand
 Community boards of New York City
 Community boards of the Bronx
 Community boards of Brooklyn
 Community boards of Manhattan
 Community boards of Queens
 Community boards of Staten Island